Busick is both a surname and a given name. Notable people with the name include:
Amanda Busick (born 1986), American sports reporter
Guy Busick, American film and television screenwriter
Nick Busick (born 1954), American professional wrestler
Steve Busick (born 1958), American football player
Busick Harwood (1745?–1814), English physician

See also
Busick, North Carolina